The University of Michigan was sued several times by students who felt they were denied admittance because they were white, and the idea of eliminating measures that provided women, minorities, and others with preferential treatment gained momentum. In 2006, voters approved Proposal 2—also called the Michigan Civil Rights Initiative—which "amend[ed] the Michigan Constitution to ban public institutions from discriminating against or giving preferential treatment to groups or individuals based on their race, gender, color, ethnicity, or national origin in public education, public employment, or public contracting". As a result, the university was prohibited from considering race as part of its holistic admissions process. Minority enrollment decreased, and the university was forced to develop alternative strategies to increase diversity among its student population.

Affirmative action refers to activities or policies that seek to help groups that are often affected by discrimination obtain equal access to opportunities, particularly in areas such as employment and education. In the early 2000s, the use of race, gender, and other factors in college and university admissions decisions came under attack.

History of affirmative action at the University of Michigan 

Affirmative action admission at the University of Michigan originated within the promotion of jobs for African Americans through federal policies. It was implemented by Hobart Taylor Jr. Lyndon Johnson, executive vice chairman of the President's Committee on Equal Employment Opportunity(PCEEO). Taylor assisted President Kennedy with the executive order that included the policy of affirmative action. From this, with his position in PCEEO, Taylor started to think of how he could expand the African American population's access to higher education.

He couldn't use the Executive Order 10925 because admissions was not stated. For this reform to occur, he had to start at schools he was familiar with. Since he was an alum at the University of Michigan's Law school, UM was an easy target for him. First, he held conferences with UM and Wayne State University to discuss the hiring of African American faculty members and their access to higher education. He then realized he needed to create an ally with someone in the admission's office and luckily he did, with Roger Heyns, UM's vice president for Academic Affairs. Heyns started this movement by proposing to the university how affirmative action will make it more accessible for black students and how the university's colorblind policies were not enough. This caught the attention of the university's President Harlan Hatcher.

Hatcher supported Taylor's reform and so he got invited, along with 174 other education leaders, by Kennedy to the White House in June 1963. There they discussed how they can create more educational opportunities for African American high schoolers.

During the fall of 1963, UM officials decided to come up with affirmative action admission policies.   They first took a census of how many black students were on campus. The results from 1964 showed 148 black undergraduates and 25 black graduates at UM.  This showed how African American made up 0.5 percent of the student body. They realized that this was the effect of the colorblind policies the university implemented. These policies would support middle-class white students and ignored the black students that met UM's admission criteria but could not afford to attend because of the little financial aid they were given by the university.

Since the university had to reduce the likelihood of resistance that would've been brought up through an affirmative action program that was exclusively for African Americans, they decide to open up a program in March 1964 that was open to all students. It mainly focused in those who have a background of a disadvantaged socio-economic status. The program looked more into high school counselor evaluations rather than looking at their GPA and standardized test scores. There also is an option that allowed students to interview with an admissions counselor. And once they are admitted through the program, they are granted a scholarships that covers most of their expenses. They named it the Opportunity Awards Program (OAP).

The purpose of OAP was to admit more African American students, however it was made open to whites as well to protect the university from resistance. For this to happen, OAP recruiters were sent to high schools that were predominately African American. After OAP's first year, during fall of 1964, sixty-seven of the seventy scholars were African American.  By the end  of the decade, the university saw an increase of the African American community from .5 percent to 3 percent. This was UM's first time seeing this many African Americans having access to a well-known state school.

Supreme Court cases

Grutter v. Bollinger 
Grutter v. Bollinger (2003) is a supreme court case in which The University of Michigan Law School denied entrance to Barbara Grutter, who was an student with a 3.8 GPA and a 161 LSAT score. She sued the university, and the then-president Lee Bollinger was the defendant. Grutter argued that she was discriminated against based on her race which would be violating the 14th Amendment and that she was rejected because the university used race as one of the factors in admissions. She also argued that the University of Michigan had no compelling interest in using race to grant admission to minority students. The University of Michigan Law School (Bollinger) disagreed and stated that there was a compelling state interest to use racial affirmative action to build a "critical mass" of minority students. In Justice Powell's diversity rational, the Supreme Court stated "the student body diversity is a compelling state interest that can justify the use of race in university admission". They see this policy as a positive because it enhances diversity on campus and doesn't allow anyone to feel isolated on campus.

The court found that the University of Michigan's Law School's affirmative action admission policies were promoting diversity within its school. Sandra Day O'Connor wrote the 5–4 majority decision that the university's policies may have been in favor of underrepresented minority groups; however, this did not enforce a quota system that was declared unconstitutional in Regents of the University of California v. Bakke. She went on to discuss that in the future (around 25 years) this racial affirmative action plan would not be necessary, but for the time being it would be helpful in promoting diversity in the law school.

While Stevens, Souter, Ginsburg and Breyer concurred with O'Connor, Rehnquist, Kennedy, Scalia and Thomas dissented. The dissent argued that using race as a factor in admission decisions was in fact a way to promote a quota system and that it should be illegal now, not in 25 years to use racial affirmative action plans.

Before this case, the compelling interest required to justify affirmative action has been correcting the effects of historic discrimination.

After this case, Justice O'Connor held that the compelling interest at hand lay in "obtaining the educational benefits that flow from a diverse student body."

Gratz v. Bollinger 
Gratz v. Bollinger (2003) is a case by the United States Supreme Court concerning two Caucasian students who applied to the University of Michigan for undergraduate admission but were denied admission on the basis of race. The case regarded the affirmative action policy in place for admissions at the University of Michigan, where on the basis of a points system to admission, minority students received additional points because of their race whereas white students did not. With a maximum of 150 attainable points, one would receive 20 extra points for being part of an underrepresented ethnicity group and would ultimately be granted admission if they met other basic requirements for admission.

According to John A. Payton, the attorney who spoke on behalf of the University of Michigan, the affirmative action policy was put in place in order to reach a "critical mass", or a certain number of individuals to the point where they feel comfortable acting as individuals. Payton argued that admitting a greater number of minority students would reduce stereotypes that may have been held by students and open a range of viewpoints and ideas for students that they wouldn't have had otherwise.

The admissions policy was ruled unconstitutional on the basis of violating the Equal Protection Clause of the 14th Amendment, Title VI, and 42 U.S.C § 1981.

Schuette v. Coalition to Defend Affirmative Action 
In the 2014 case Schuette v. Coalition to Defend Affirmative Action, the Supreme Court ruled 6-2 that Michigan's constitutional amendment banning affirmative action was constitutional.

Initiatives by the university since affirmative action repeal 

After Michigan voters banned affirmative action at public colleges and universities, minority enrollment at the University of Michigan plummeted. In consequence, even 11 years later, the school continues to struggle with building a diverse composition of incoming freshmen students every year. Similarly to many other schools across the country, University of Michigan faced the challenge that comes with favoring minorities whose credentials are below the average accomplishments of the majority of the campus. This leads to them being discouraged and having decreased chances of succeeding. From this struggle to find the most effective way to create diversity, the school has put in tremendous effort after the 2006 court ruling to ameliorate the issue. Recent efforts in the past two years by the university specifically under the new administration of President Mark Schlissel have employed innovative solutions to tackle the issue of diversity on campus.

Adjacent to the University of Michigan's campus is the Trotter Multicultural Center, a space created by the university to promote the development of "a better understanding and appreciation for the Multicultural diversity represented at the University". In 2015, the university received a strong push from the "Being Black at Michigan" movement to create a multicultural center that was more central to the campus and student life. Therefore, in late 2015, University of Michigan announced a new, $10 million multicultural center that would be embedded in the heart of campus. Planning and construction for this project has continued to progress in 2017.

President Schlissel, throughout his first few years at the University of Michigan, has continued to affirm is commitment to harboring diversity. In 2016, when the Supreme Court ruled in favor of affirmative action at the University of Texas at Austin, President Schlissel released a statement in support of the ruling. In this statement he highlighted the importance of diversity in order for universities to succeed.

Student concerns after affirmative action repeal 
In response to Michigan's court cases regarding affirmative action, University of Michigan's Black Student Union (BSU) launched a Twitter page to open a safe space to express their feeling of racial isolation. The Twitter hashtag, #BBUM (Being Black at the University of Michigan) was launched in November following the Supreme Court's arguments in the lawsuit relating to the Michigan's ban and the chaos that followed a Michigan fraternity's racist party invitation via Facebook. The tweets included input of daily experiences from an extensive array of black students attending the University of Michigan. " '#BBUM is NOT raising your hand in class because you do not want to be THAT black person who just doesn't get it ...' wrote one poster."

Additionally, another student group that goes by the name "Students 4 Justice" organized a petition with 835 signatures exacting outright support by President Schlissel primarily through university policies. Some of these demands included "Declar[ing] solidarity with us as black students and students of color...Create a permanent designated space on central campus for black students and students of color to organize, and do social justice work. This is not the same as Trotter Multicultural Center, because we want a space solely dedicated to community organizing and social justice work specifically for people of color."

The United Coalition for Racial Justice (UCRJ) offered additional feedback to supplement the BSU's trending hashtag, #BBUM, regarding the University of Michigan's demographics conflict. The group organized an expression of testimony, "Speak Out: 1,000 Strong for Racial Justice" which was attended by students, faculty, alumni and many others in support of the cause. The U-M American Culture online site discussed the protest by highlighting the focus to be, "low underrepresented minority enrollment and poor racial climate for students of color at the University of Michigan. While Provost Pollack's recent unveiling of new U-M diversity and inclusion initiatives represents an important step forward, we must continue to pursue student-led, direct civic engagement to hold the administration accountable. To avoid repeating past mistakes, we must ensure that these new initiatives are executed transparently, with direct student participation at every phase: that the administration not only welcome our voices, but our presences at the decision table." Following the demonstration, the university guaranteed to allocate 300,000 towards a multicultural center that would be located on their central campus.

Composition of student body analysis 
The ban on affirmative action in Michigan was upheld in 2014,. 2015 saw the lowest percentage of white students at the University of Michigan in the sixteen years of data used below. The discrepancies between the first ten years of data and the following six are because of the 2000 U.S. census. This added multiracial and Hawaiian categories. It cannot be said why the university took so long to add these categories themselves. Another consequence of the multiracial category is the rapid decline of the Black, Unknown and Native American categories. In all three of  categories a significant jump downward in size at the same time the Two or More category appears. The enrollment of the Freshman class is not a reasonable explanation for this affect. Over this time span the Asian percentage of the undergraduate student body has grown very slightly. The same came be said for the Hispanic percentage. Overall the student body makeup has not changed that much. The largest percentage change is the decrease in white students. This decrease in white students, while most other minority groups have stayed almost exactly the same or increased, would seem to indicate a direct substitution in the student body of minorities for white students. It is too early to determine the long-term impact of repealing Affirmative Action at the University of Michigan. However, recent research shows that a decline in minority students is to be expected.

This information is public record given by the University of Michigan.

References 

University of Michigan
University of Michigan